Maria Jacobini (17 February 1892 – 20 November 1944) was an Italian film actress. She was married to the film director Gennaro Righelli and appeared in many of his silent films for the Vesuvio Film Company. She worked in the German film industry in the mid-1920s. She was the older sister of actress Diomira Jacobini.

Selected filmography
 Joan of Arc (1913)
 Goodbye Youth (1918)
 Tortured Soul (1919)
 The Prey (1921)
Red Love (1921)
 The Voyage (1921)
 La Boheme (1923)
 Rudderless (1924)
 Orient (1924)
 The Doll Queen (1925)
 Beatrice Cenci (1926)
 The Bordellos of Algiers (1927)
 Bigamie (1927)
 Folly of Love (1928)
 Ariadne in Hoppegarten (1928)
 The Case of Prosecutor M (1928)
 Five Anxious Days (1928)
 The Carnival of Venice (1928)
 Villa Falconieri (1928)
 Maman Colibri (1929)
 The Living Corpse (1929)
 Patatrac (1931)
 La scala (1931)
 The Matchmaker (1934)
 Giuseppe Verdi (1938)
 Eternal Melodies (1940)
 L'attore scomparso (1941)
 Street of the Five Moons (1942)
 La signorina (1942)
 The Mountain Woman (1944)

References

Bibliography
 Moliterno, Gino. The A to Z of Italian Cinema. Scarecrow Press, 2009.
 Vacche, Angela Dalle. Diva: Defiance and Passion in Early Italian Cinema. University of Texas Press, 2008.

External links

1892 births
1944 deaths
Italian film actresses
Italian silent film actresses
Actresses from Rome
20th-century Italian actresses